The English is a revisionist western television miniseries produced by the BBC and Amazon Prime, written and directed by Hugo Blick. It stars Emily Blunt and Chaske Spencer. It premiered in the United Kingdom on BBC Two and iPlayer on 10 November 2022, and in the United States on Amazon Prime Video on 11 November 2022.

Plot
An Englishwoman, Lady Cornelia Locke, comes to the West in 1890 looking for revenge on the man she sees as responsible for the death of her son, and meets Eli Whipp, ex-cavalry scout and member of the Pawnee Nation by birth, on his way to Nebraska to claim the land he is owed for his service in the US army, despite having been told that the white men will not honour their debt. They discover a possible shared history.

Cast and characters

Episodes

Production
In February 2020, Emily Blunt joined the cast of the series, with Hugo Blick writing and directing, and Amazon Studios and BBC Studios set to co-produce. In May 2021, Chaske Spencer, Rafe Spall, Toby Jones, Tom Hughes, Stephen Rea, Valerie Pachner, Ciarán Hinds, Malcolm Storry, Steve Wall, Nichola McAuliffe, Sule Rimi and Cristian Solimeno joined the cast.

Principal photography began in Spain in May 2021 and ended in September 2021.

Reception
The review aggregator website Rotten Tomatoes reports an 82% approval rating and an average rating of 7.7/10, based on 56 reviews. The website's consensus reads: "A visual knockout elevated by Emily Blunt and Chaske Spencer's performances, The English is a heady and somewhat meandering Western made with admirable craft." On Metacritic, it has a weighted average score of 74 out of 100 based on 26 critics, indicating "generally favorable reviews". The Guardian gave it five out of five, stating: "although you might lose track of the details, the plot never becomes impenetrable or the performances less than compelling" citing Spencer and Blunt's performances as “a revelation”.

Accolades
Spencer was nominated in the Leading Actor (Male) category at the Royal Television Society Programme Awards in March 2023.

See also
Jericho, another British Western-style TV series that re-imagines the construction of a railway viaduct in Yorkshire with genre tropes.

Notes

References

External links
 

2022 American television series debuts
2022 American television series endings
2020s American drama television series
2020s American television miniseries
2022 British television series debuts
2022 British television series endings
2020s British drama television series
2020s British television miniseries
2020s Western (genre) television series
Amazon Prime Video original programming
BBC television dramas
Television series by All3Media
Television series by Amazon Studios
English-language television shows
Television series set in the 1890s
Television shows filmed in Spain